Hoplosuchus is a genus of crocodylomorph belonging to Protosuchidae. It is so far only known definitely from one specimen, a skeleton collected from sandstone of the Upper Jurassic-age Morrison Formation rocks at Dinosaur National Monument, Utah, during road construction. It is the basalmost crocodyliform of the Morrison Formation, as suggested by such attributes as still having antorbital fenestrae in the skull. The limbs were relatively long, suggesting that the animal was terrestrial. Two rows of bony scutes ran down the back. The crowns of the teeth are not well preserved, so the diet cannot be determined with certainty. Given its small size, it probably ate insects and small vertebrates; it may have been carnivorous or omnivorous.

Classification

Charles W. Gilmore named Hoplosuchus in 1926; the type species is H. kayi. He described it as an aetosaur, a type of armored herbivorous archosaur related to the crocodylomorphs, but it was later reevaluated as a crocodylomorph itself. Sometimes classified as an atoposaurid, a 1988 review of atoposaurids found it more likely to be a protosuchian-grade crocodylomorph. A 2017 cladistic analysis of Cassissuchus recovered it as a member of Protosuchidae.

References

Late Jurassic crocodylomorphs of North America
Late Jurassic crocodylomorphs
Morrison fauna
Taxa named by Charles W. Gilmore
Fossil taxa described in 1926
Prehistoric pseudosuchian genera